Amal Knight (born 19 November 1993) is a Jamaican professional footballer who plays for Lexington SC as a goalkeeper.

Early life and education

Knight attended Wolmer's Boys High School before earning a scholarship to the University of the West Indies.

Club career
He played club football for Harbour View and UWI. In 2020, Knight signed with new USL Championship club San Diego Loyal. In June 2020 he moved on loan to FC Tucson. 

In July 2021, Knight signed with Arnett Gardens in Jamaica.

On 11 January, Knight signed with Lexington SC of USL League One.

International career
He made his international debut for Jamaica in 2018.

References

External links

1993 births
Living people
Jamaican footballers
Jamaica international footballers
Harbour View F.C. players
UWI F.C. players
San Diego Loyal SC players
Association football goalkeepers
Jamaican expatriate footballers
Expatriate soccer players in the United States
Jamaican expatriate sportspeople in the United States
Sportspeople from Kingston, Jamaica
FC Tucson players
USL League One players
Arnett Gardens F.C. players
Lexington SC players